Valentyn Yelinskas (born 15 August 1958 in Makiivka) was a Ukrainian football goalkeeper and coach.

Career
After his sports school in Luhansk, Yelinskas enrolled in institute of finances and economics in Ternopil where he studied for couple of years and played for the school team. After that he was drafted to the army, particularly the KGB signal regiment, but local team of the Carpathian Military District SKA Lvov managed to secure his services. About three months before demobilization, Yelinskas was transferred to Podollia in Khmelnytskyi for which he played for another couple of years. While playing in Podillia, he was finally noticed by the Soviet top clubs Chornomorets, Metalist, Dynamo. Yelinskas chose Chornomorets that was coached by the Russian manager Nikita Simonyan.

In Chornomorets during a training session Yelinskas received a concussion and was hospitalized where he contracted the "Botkin sickness" (Hepatitis A). Because of that did not play for almost a season. In 1982 there appeared an opportunity to move to Donetsk as its goalkeeper Yuriy Dehteryov was getting ready to retire, yet did not want to move if Shakhtar, which struggled during that time, would relegate out of the Soviet Top League. Chornomorets which at that time was managed by Viktor Prokopenko did not want to release Yelinskas, so he sneaked out and left for Shakhtar. For some time the Donetsk team was not even able to list him on its roster. Nonetheless, later everything settled and Yelinskas with Shakhtar won the 1983 Soviet Cup.

Honours
 Soviet Cup
 Winner: 1983
 Finalist: 1984–1985

References

External links
 

1958 births
2008 deaths
Sportspeople from Makiivka
Soviet footballers
Ukrainian footballers
Soviet Top League players
FC Shakhtar Donetsk players
FC Ternopil players
SKA Lviv players
FC Podillya Khmelnytskyi players
FC Chornomorets Odesa players
FC Zorya Luhansk players
FC Mariupol players
Association football goalkeepers